Eupsophus roseus, the rosy ground frog, is a species of frog in the family Alsodidae.
It is endemic to Chile.
Its natural habitats are temperate forest, rivers, swampland, and intermittent freshwater marshes.
It is threatened by habitat loss.

References

Eupsophus
Amphibians of Chile
Amphibians of Patagonia
Endemic fauna of Chile
Taxonomy articles created by Polbot
Amphibians described in 1841
Taxa named by André Marie Constant Duméril